Events from the year 1609 in France

Incumbents
 Monarch – Henry IV

Events
29 June – Action of 29 June 1609

Births

 25 November – Henrietta Maria, Queen of England, Scotland, and Ireland (died 1669)

Full date missing
Louis Boullogne, painter (died 1674)
Jean de Gassion, military commander (died 1647)

Deaths

Full date missing
André du Laurens, physician (born 1558)
Eustache Du Caurroy, composer (born 1549)
Joseph Justus Scaliger, scholar (born 1540)
Isabelle de Limeuil, noblewoman (born c.1535)

See also

References

1600s in France